The 8th Paravur Municipal council election was held on 8 December 2020 and the result announced on 16 December. Both LDF and UDF fronts won 14 seats each and NDA won 4 seats. The result declared as Hung because none of the fronts got the minimum seats to rule

History
Paravur was one of the 4 panchayaths initially formed in the erstwhile Travancore state. It was formed in the year 1937 along with Nedumangad, Perumbavoor, Boothapandi(now in Tamilnadu). The first panchayath election held in 1942. There was only one ward in Paravur then. In 1953, Paravur panchayath bifurcated and formed Poothakkulam panchayath from it. Later in 1985, Paravur upgraded as a municipality.

Election history

Background
The tenure of the members of the municipal council of Paravur ended on early November 2020. As per the voters list published in 2020 November, there were around 31,358 eligible voters (14,140 male voters, 17,218 female voters) in which 22,912 (10,002 male voters and 12,910 female voters) cast their votes through 32 polling stations in the municipal area. The total polling rate was 73.07%.

There were 32 wards with one polling booth in each ward. The vote counting station in the municipality is Kottapuram Government LP School.

Parties and coalitions
There are two major political coalitions in Paravur. The Left Democratic Front (LDF) is the coalition of left wing and far-left parties, led by the Communist Party of India (Marxist) (CPI(M)). The United Democratic Front (UDF) is the coalition of centrist and centre-left parties led by the Indian National Congress.

Left Democratic Front

United Democratic Front

National Democratic Alliance

Results

Ward-wise

By alliance

See also
Paravur
2020 Kollam Municipal Corporation election

References

2020 Kerala local body elections
2020 elections in India
Elections in Kerala